Debra Cowan is a singer based in Shrewsbury, Massachusetts.

Biography

Debra Cowan had worked as  middle school maths teacher, until,  in 1997, she decided to quit and pursue her desire to sing. For 6 month she had lived in Edinburgh, Scotland where she learned the art of unaccompanied singing.

After her return to the US, in 1998,  she began traveling and performing all over New England, in folk clubs or festivals like the Old Songs Festival and Broadstairs Folk Week.

Specializing primarily in traditional songs, often maritime-themed, she tours regularly in the United Kingdom and the United States.  Rich Warren of the Midnight Special gave her CD, Fond Desire Farewell, an honorable mention in his list "Rich Warren's Past Favorites" for 2008.

Present career

She has released five full-length recordings, which were praised in the US as well as in the UK. Debra has collaborated with Dave Mattacks, Brooks Williams, Kathy Mattea and Reba McEntire. Her third recording, “Fond Desire Farewell”, was produced by former Fairport Convention drummer Dave Mattacks.

She has performed  on American live radio shows such as WFMT’s Folkstage, hosted by Rich Warren, WESU's "Acoustic Blender," and Tom May's River City Folk.
  
Debra is a member of American Federation of Musicians Local 1000.

Private life
She is currently living in Central Massachusetts with her husband, Kevin and their two cats, Hazel and Haku.

References

External links
Debra Cowan official website
YouTube video of Debra Cowan performing Walloping Window Blind at the Chicago Maritime Festival.

American women singers
Year of birth missing (living people)
Place of birth missing (living people)
Living people
21st-century American women